In Sikhism, the Five Thieves 
(), also called the five vices (Punjabi: ਪੰਜ ਬੁਰਾਈਆਂ paja burā'ī'āṁ), are the five major weaknesses of the human personality at variance with its spiritual essence, and are known as "thieves" because they steal a person's inherent common sense. These five thieves are kaam (lust), krodh (wrath), lobh (greed), moh (attachment) and ahankar (ego or excessive pride).

See also

 Ahankar
 Kaam
 Krodh
 Lobh
 Moh

 Six Enemies (Hinduism)
 Kashaya (Jainism)
 Kleshas (Buddhism)
 Five hindrances (Buddhism)

References

Further reading 
 Sher Singh, The Philosophy of Sikhism. Shiromani Gurdwara Parbandhak Committee
 Nirbhai Singh, Philosophy of Sikhism. Delhi: Atlantic Publishers & Distri, 1990
 Nripinder Singh, The Sikh Moral Tradition. Delhi: Manohar, 1990
 Teja Singh, Essays in Sikhism. Lahore: Sikh University Press, 1944
 Wazir Singh, Philosophy of Sikh Religion. Delhi: Ess Ess Publications, 1981
 Avtar Singh, Ethics of the Sikhs. Patiala: Punjabi University, 1970

Sikh terminology
Sin